Twila True is an American businesswoman and philanthropist.

She is currently the CEO and President of True Family Enterprises. She is the founder of True Children's Home orphanage, True Sioux Hope Foundation, and the co-founder of 1500 Sound Academy music school.

Career
True was born to Oglala tribe parents and grew up in California and on the Pine Ridge Indian Reservation, South Dakota.  She has served as Chief Executive Officer of Synthane Taylor, circuit board manufacturers. She resided in Hong Kong and China with her husband Alan where they operated True Innovations, a designer and manufacturer of office furniture, which was acquired by Li & Fung. After her return to the United States in 2012, she co-founded True Family Enterprises with her husband.

In October 2018, True signed a partnership deal with MonarchFx supply chain company, through her Twila True Collaborations banner.

True's jewellery designs made debut at 2018 New York Fashion Week and featured along with the Zang Toi's collection.

As philanthropist
In 2006, while in China, she opened True Children's Home to provide medical care for orphans.

In January 2015, she co founded True Sioux Hope Foundation, with a head office in Newport Beach, California, a nonprofit organization to help improve the lives of the communities in the Pine Ridge. An emergency shelter for children, The Safe Home, was also opened by True at the Pine Ridge reservation in February 2017.

True has also launched the Twelve Cycles initiative to fulfil the basic feminine needs and education to the girls of the Oglala Sioux tribe.

She supports fundraising foundations including Oceana, and CASA.

1500 Sound Academy 
She co-founded 1500 Sound Academy in 2018, music academy in Inglewood, California, with James Fauntleroy and Larrance "Rance" Dopson. In May 2019, Roland signed a collaboration deal with the 1500 Sound Academy. In March 2021, the academy signed a deal with Yellowbrick to deliver on-demand online programs. In June 2021, Arizona State University signed a deal to start the joint online music program Professional Certificate in Music Production through its Herberger Institute for Design and the Arts. In November 2021, Fender and 1500 Sound Academy announced a partnership deal to provide scholarships.

In March 2022, a Taiwanese campus was announced to be opened in Taipei, with Chen Zihong appointed as the principal.

Personal life
True is married to Alan True and they have four children.

In October 2019, the couple sold their house on the Harbor Island, Newport Beach to Chinese billionaire Eric Tan for $37 million.

Accolades
 2015 Most Influential - Orange County Register
 2016 Entrepreneur of the Year - Orange County Business Journal
 2019 Outstanding Corporation - CASA

Notes and sources

Living people
Oglala people
21st-century Native American women
21st-century Native Americans
Native American people from California
American women philanthropists
21st-century American philanthropists
Philanthropists from California
American women in business
American women company founders
21st-century American businesswomen
21st-century American businesspeople
Businesspeople from California
American women investors
Year of birth missing (living people)
21st-century women philanthropists